These are the official results of the 2006 Ibero-American Championships in Athletics which took place on May 26–28, 2006 in Ponce, Puerto Rico.

Men's results

100 meters

Heats – May 26Wind:Heat 1: -1.0 m/s, Heat 2: +0.5 m/s

Final – May 26Wind:+0.3 m/s

200 meters

Heats – May 28Wind:Heat 1: -1.6 m/s, Heat 2: -0.5 m/s

Final – May 28Wind:+1.8 m/s

400 meters

Heats – May 26

Final – May 27

800 meters

Heats – May 26

Final – May 27

1500 meters
May 28

3000 meters
May 27

5000 meters
May 26

110 meters hurdles

Heats – May 28Wind:Heat 1: -0.2 m/s, Heat 2: -2.0 m/s

Final – May 28Wind:+1.2 m/s

400 meters hurdles

Heats – May 26

Final – May 27

3000 meters steeplechase
May 26

4 x 100 meters relay
May 28

4 x 400 meters relay
May 28

20,000 meters walk
May 28

High jump
May 28

Pole vault
May 27

Long jump
May 26

Triple jump
May 28

Shot put
May 26

Discus throw
May 27

Hammer throw
May 28

Javelin throw
May 27

Decathlon
May 27–28

Women's results

100 meters

Heats – May 26Wind:Heat 1: -1.6 m/s, Heat 2: -1.9 m/s

Final – May 26Wind:-1.1 m/s

200 meters

Heats – May 28Wind:Heat 1: -0.5 m/s, Heat 2: -1.0 m/s

Final – May 28Wind:+0.7 m/s

400 meters

Heats – May 26

Final – May 27

800 meters
May 27

1500 meters
May 28

3000 meters
May 27

5000 meters
May 26

100 meters hurdles
May 27Wind: -0.2 m/s

400 meters hurdles
May 27

3000 meters steeplechase
May 26

4 x 100 meters relay
May 28

4 x 400 meters relay
May 28

10,000 meters walk
May 27

High jump
May 27

Pole vault
May 26

Long jump
May 27

Triple jump
May 28

Shot put
May 26

Discus throw
May 28

Hammer throw
May 27

Javelin throw
May 26

Heptathlon
May 27–28

References

 Results

Ibero-American Championships Results
Events at the Ibero-American Championships in Athletics